The Shackleton–Rowett Expedition, 1921–22, was the last Antarctic expedition led by Sir Ernest Shackleton. Proposed as an ambitious two-year programme of Antarctic exploration it was curtailed by the death of Shackleton and the inadequacies of the expedition's ship, Quest. Under the command of Frank Wild several attempts were made to break through the Antarctic pack ice, but the expedition was never able to proceed further than longitude 20°E. On the crew's return to Cape Town to refit in preparation for the second term they were ordered home. The crew of the Quest comprised 24 members in all, but only 19 were on board for the start of the Antarctic portion (Hussey accompanied Shackleton's body when it was put on board a ship for England, and Eriksen, Mooney and Bee-Mason had left before the ship reached South Georgia). Gerald Lysaght, a yachtsman, accompanied the crew from Plymouth to Cape Verde.

Notes

References

United Kingdom and the Antarctic
1921 in Antarctica
Antarctica-related lists
Antarctic expeditions
Lists of explorers